John Leavitt may refer to:

John Leavitt (1608–1691), American pioneer; founding deacon of the oldest church in continuous use in the U.S.
John Leavitt (Ohio settler) (1755–1815), early settler of Ohio's Western Reserve lands
John Wheeler Leavitt (1790–1870), New York City businessman; grandfather of portraitist Cecilia Beaux
John McDowell Leavitt (1824–1909), American academic and Episcopal clergyman
John Hooker Leavitt (1831–1906), American banker and Iowa state senator 
John Brooks Leavitt (1849–1930), New York City attorney, author and reformer; son of John McDowell Leavitt
John Faunce Leavitt (1905–1974), American marine artist and museum curator